was a flatland castle located in Echizen, Fukui Prefecture, Japan. Today, a memorial to the castle can be seen at what is now Shōgaku-ji.

References 
http://www.takekawa.net/castle/html/shiro/koushinetsu/fukui/shinzenkouji.html (Japanese)

Archaeological sites in Japan
Castles in Fukui Prefecture
Former castles in Japan